Aes is the Latin word for bronze, also used to designate the early forms of Roman Republican currency. The word was later standardized as As, low-value coins that were produced until the reign of Emperor Diocletian, who ruled from 284 to 305 AD.

References

Latin words and phrases